Doloonjingiin Idevkhten is a Mongolian diplomat and the current Ambassador of Mongolia to Russia, presenting his credentials to Russian President Dmitry Medvedev on 16 December 2009.

References

Year of birth missing (living people)
Living people
Ambassadors of Mongolia to Russia
Mongolian diplomats